Uwe Wassmer (born 22 January 1966) is a German former professional footballer who played as a striker during the 1980s and 1990s.

Career
Wassmer was born in Wehr, Baden-Württemberg. He began his career in Switzerland with FC Aarau in 1985 and spent three years with the club before joining FC Schalke 04 of Germany. After just one season with Schalke, he returned to Switzerland to play for FC Basel. He spent just one season at Basel, also, and went back to FC Aarau for the second time in his career where he was part of the side that won the Swiss national title in 1992–93. In 1993, he signed for SC Freiburg where he went on to play over 100 matches, scoring 30 goals.

On 22 September 1996, while playing for Freiburg, Wassmer set a Bundesliga record in a game against Leverkusen, by scoring just 13 seconds after his introduction, making it the fastest goal ever scored by a substitute.

SV Waldhof Mannheim signed him in 1999 and he retired in the Summer of 2000.

On 1 July 2003, he became manager of amateur Swiss team Dottingen SV. During the 2003–04 season, his team were promoted to the regional league but were relegated after just one season. In August 2008, he was appointed manager of German side SC Riegel.

References

External links
 
 

1966 births
Living people
People from Waldshut (district)
Sportspeople from Freiburg (region)
German footballers
Association football forwards
Bundesliga players
2. Bundesliga players
Swiss Super League players
FC Aarau players
FC Schalke 04 players
FC Basel players
SC Freiburg players
SV Waldhof Mannheim players
German expatriate footballers
German expatriate sportspeople in Switzerland
Expatriate footballers in Switzerland
Footballers from Baden-Württemberg